Realme 7 Pro (stylized as realme 7 Pro) is a dual-SIM smartphone from the Chinese company Realme. It was launched on 10 September 2020. Realme 7 pro became fifth most selling budget smartphone of all time till now. The  devices has Gorilla Glass 3 shatter resistant glass with splash resistant back.

References

External links
 

7 Pro
Mobile phones introduced in 2020
Mobile phones with multiple rear cameras
Mobile phones with 4K video recording
Discontinued smartphones